The 2015 Trofeo Alfredo Binda-Comune di Cittiglio was the 40th running of the Trofeo Alfredo Binda-Comune di Cittiglio, a women's bicycle race in Italy. It was the second race of the 2015 UCI Women's Road World Cup season and was held on 29 March 2015, starting and finishing in Cittiglio.

Results

Race result

World Cup standings

See also
2015 in women's road cycling

References

Trofeo Alfredo Binda
Trofeo Alfredo Binda
Trofeo Alfredo Binda-Comune di Cittiglio